The Willow Foundation is a national charity established in 1999 by Arsenal footballer and BBC sports commentator Bob Wilson and his wife Megs as a lasting memorial to their daughter, Anna, who died of cancer aged 31. It is the only national charity to provide psychological and emotional support for seriously ill 16- to 40-year-olds through the provision of special day experiences.

Every special day aims to provide beneficiaries and their loved ones with a break from the realities of their diagnosis and treatment and the inspiration to make the most out of life. At a time of uncertainty, spending quality time with family and friends can help restore a sense of normality, boost confidence and create precious memories for the future.

To date, Willow has provided more than 15,000 special days for young adults living with life-threatening conditions including cancer, motor neurone disease, cystic fibrosis and Huntington's disease.  2013 saw the 10,000th Special Day Willow provided and 2019 will see the 16,000th. The importance of having something positive to look forward to at such a difficult time cannot be overestimated and provides memories and motivation for the beneficiaries and those close to them.

The charity receives no government or lottery funding and is totally reliant on the generosity of individuals, companies and trusts to fund its work. Among donors and supporters have been Pat Jennings OBE KSG, Natasha Kaplinsky, DJ Tim Westwood, Bob Finch and Michael Holland's Oil Aid.

In 2018 a football superfan raised £17,500 for the charity by touring 92 league stadiums in 12 days and becoming the first person to run around every ground he visited in the country.

Stars on Canvas
Stars on Canvas was a high-profile charity event held in December 2008 and again in 2010 involving numerous famous celebrities, sports personalities, artists, actors and comedians. Each star was asked to create an art image on canvas that portrayed aspects of their personality and character. The event was repeated successfully in 2012 - with a press night and public showing at Maddox Arts Gallery in London. Mo Farah's canvas fetched over £2,000 alone.

Among the celebrities who donated their art were actors Lord Attenborough, John Hurt and Jude Law, artists Peter Blake, Tracy Emin, Karen Burt, Sara Abbott, and Jamie McCartney, comedians Michael "Atters" Attree, Steve Coogan, Matt Lucas, Catherine Tate and London Mayor Boris Johnson

References

Health charities in the United Kingdom
Charities based in Hertfordshire